Employees of the mass media company Condé Nast unionized in 2022.

History 

Condé Nast workers announced their union drive in March 2022 with a letter to management requesting voluntary recognition.

The company recognized the union in September 2022 following a card check in which about 80% of eligible employees submitted union cards, indicating their interest in a union without requiring a National Labor Relations Board-held election. The union covers editorial, production, and video employees at Condé Nast publications that have not previously unionized, including Vanity Fair, Allure, Architectural Digest, Bon Appétit, and the in-house production team Condé Nast Entertainment. Previously unionized publications retained their separate union organizations: Ars Technica, The New Yorker, Pitchfork, and Wired.

See also 

 The New Yorker Union

References 

Trade unions established in 2022
Journalists' trade unions
Labor relations by company
2022 in labor relations
Condé Nast